Upon a Different Shore is the second studio album by English comedian and actor Alexander Armstrong. The album was released on 28 October 2016 by Rhino and East West. Unlike Armstrong's debut album A Year of Songs (2015), Upon a Different Shore sees him branch out into some non-classical music, including a cover of "Firestone" by Kygo. It debuted at number 8 on the UK Albums Chart.

Track listing

Studio personnel 
Recorded at Air Studios, North Seven Studios, Henry Licht Studio, Norbury Brook Studio
Recorded by Peter Cobbin, Peter Hutchings, John Reynolds, Marcus Cliffe
Engineering assistants: Fiona Cruickshank, John Prestage, Rhys Nord
Pro Tools Programming: Andy Bradfield
Mixed at Studio A London
Mixed by Andy Bradfield

Charts

Weekly charts

Year-end charts

References

2016 albums
Alexander Armstrong albums
2016 classical albums
Rhino Entertainment albums
East West Records albums